Nuthin' Fancy is the third studio album by the Southern rock band Lynyrd Skynyrd, released in March 1975. It was their first to reach the top 10, peaking at number 9 on the U.S. album chart. It was certified gold on June 27, 1975, and platinum on July 21, 1987, by the RIAA. This was the band's first record with new drummer Artimus Pyle. In late May 1975, guitarist Ed King left the band in the middle of their "Torture Tour." The album is best known for its only single, "Saturday Night Special," an anti-gun song that peaked at #27 on the U.S. Billboard chart.

Track listing 

 Sides one and two were combined as tracks 1–8 on CD reissues.

Tracks 9 and 10 are previously unreleased

Personnel 
Lynyrd Skynyrd
 Ronnie Van Zant – lead vocals
 Gary Rossington – guitar
 Allen Collins – guitar
 Ed King – guitar
 Leon Wilkeson – bass guitar
 Artimus Pyle – drums, percussion
 Billy Powell – keyboards

Additional personnel
 Barry Harwood – dobro, mandolin
 Jimmy Hall – harmonica
 David Foster – piano
 Bobbye Hall – percussion

Chart positions

Certifications

References 

1975 albums
Lynyrd Skynyrd albums
MCA Records albums
Albums produced by Al Kooper